Lee County High School is the name of several high schools in the United States:

 Lee County High School (Leesburg, Georgia)
 Lee County High School (Kentucky) in Beattyville, Kentucky
 Lee County High School (Sanford, North Carolina)
 East Lee County High School (Lehigh Acres, Florida), a high school in the School District of Lee County (Florida)

See also
 Lee High School (disambiguation)
 Auburn High School (Alabama), formerly named Lee County High School